This is a list of earthquakes in 1999. Only earthquakes of magnitude 6 or above are included, unless they result in damage and/or casualties, or are notable for some other reason.  All dates are listed according to UTC (Coordinated Universal Time) time.

Compared to other years

Overall

By death toll

By magnitude

By month

January

Two people were injured and some livestock were killed in Ninglang County.
At least 1,185 people were killed and 700 others were missing.
Minor damage was caused in Nikolski.

February

March

At least 103 people were killed.

April

May

June

At least 14 people were killed.

July

At least one person was killed and 27 others were injured.

August

At least 17,118 people were killed and up to 50,000 others were injured; damage totalled to $6.5 billion.

September

At least 143 people were killed, 2,000 were injured, 50,000 were homeless and 53,000+ buildings were damaged or destroyed.

October

November

At least 845-894 people were killed, 4,948 were injured and 55,000 were displaced.
At least 5-10 people died and 40-100 were injured.

December

Power outages also occurred in Manila.
One person died in Tacloban and minor damage was caused.
At least five people were killed and more than 200 were injured.
At least 22-24 people were killed, 175 were injured and 15,000 were displaced.

References

1999
1999
1999